Konkola Copper Mines is a copper mining and smelting company in Zambia. It is a subsidiary of Vedanta Resources, a mining conglomerate based in Mumbai and London.  Konkola's name is abbreviated to KCM.

Operations
KCM currently produces 2 million tons of copper ore per year. The company's Konkola Deep Mining Project will expand its capacity to 6 million tons of ore per year.

Facilities include:
Konkola Copper Mine
Nchanga Copper Mines near Chingola, also producing cobalt; Nchanga ore concentrator Plants
Nampundwe Pyrites Mine (pyrites are used in the copper smelting process)
The Nchanga (in Chingola) and Nkana Smelters, & Nkana Refinery etc. in Kitwe.  The Nchanga is currently the largest copper smelter in Zambia.

Exports are transported to the ports of Dar es Salaam in Tanzania and Durban in South Africa.  Principal markets include the Middle East and East Asia.  Metal is also sold domestically, to Metal Fabricators of Zambia (ZAMEFA).

See also
 Lungowe v Vedanta Resources plc
Copper mining and extraction

References

External links
Konkola Copper Mines official website
Vedanta Resources official website
Konkola Copper Mines at Alacrastore
https://www.zccm-ih.com.zm/investments/mining-assets/konkola-copper-mines-plc/
https://www.banktrack.org/project/konkola_copper_mines
https://www.mining-technology.com/news/zambia-blocks-vedantas-bid-konkola/

Copper mining companies of Zambia
Companies with year of establishment missing
Vedanta Resources